Lora is a town on the Mataquito River, in the Licantén commune of the Curicó Province, Maule Region, in Chile. It was named for the tribe of Promaucaes that inhabited the region.

References

Sources 
  Thomas Guevara, Historia de Curicó, Alicante : Biblioteca Virtual Miguel de Cervantes, 2000 Originally published in 1891.

Populated places in Curicó Province